Rikard Brunn (27 May 1893 – 5 November 1939) was a Swedish weightlifter. He competed at the 1920 Summer Olympics and the 1924 Summer Olympics.

References

External links
 

1893 births
1939 deaths
Swedish male weightlifters
Olympic weightlifters of Sweden
Weightlifters at the 1920 Summer Olympics
Weightlifters at the 1924 Summer Olympics
Sportspeople from Stockholm
20th-century Swedish people